Michael Griffin may refer to:

Sports
 Michael Griffin (American football) (born 1985), football player
 Michael Griffin (footballer) (1887–?), English footballer
 Mike Griffin (outfielder) (1865–1908), American baseball center fielder
 Mike Griffin (pitcher) (born 1957), American baseball pitcher
 Mike Griffin (basketball), American college basketball coach

Others
 Michael D. Griffin (born 1949), former NASA administrator 2005–09 and Under Secretary of Defense for Research and Engineering
 Michael F. Griffin (born 1962), American murdererer of David Gunn
 Michael Griffin (Irish priest) (1892–1920), Irish Roman Catholic priest shot dead during the Anglo-Irish War
 Michael Griffin (Wisconsin politician) (1842–1899), American politician
 Michael Griffin (Indiana politician), American politician from Indiana
 Michael Griffin (escape artist) (born 1961), American escape artist, magician and illusionist